The 1995–96 Logan Cup, known as the Lonrho Logan Cup for sponsorship reasons, was a first-class cricket competition held in Zimbabwe from 15 September 1995 – 21 April 1996. It was won by Matabeleland, who beat Mashonaland Country Districts in the final having finished second behind them in the league stage of the competition. In the first innings of the final, Wayne James of Matabeleland, equaled the record of most dismissals in an innings by a wicket-keeper, with nine. He went on to take four more dismissals in the second innings, breaking the record for most dismissals in a match.

Points table

Final

References

1995 in cricket
1995 in Zimbabwean sport
1996 in cricket
1996 in Zimbabwean sport
Domestic cricket competitions in 1995–96
Logan Cup